Kosrat Rasul Ali is a Kurdish politician and the leader of the Supreme Political Council of Patriotic Union of Kurdistan (PUK), veteran Peshmerga military leader, former Prime Minister, and former Vice President of the Kurdistan Region.

Early life
He was born in 1952 as Abdulla Rasul in the oil-rich village of Shiwashok near the city of Koya, which is located in the province of Erbil. His father was Rasul Ali, who worked for the oil company near the village. The family was well-known in the area.

Peshmerga

In 1975, Kosrat joined the Kurdistan Democratic Party and participated in the September Revolution led by Mullah Mustafa Barzani. At the end of 1975, he joined Komala and took over supervision of student activities. He founded the Kurdistan Students Group in Kirkuk with a number of his colleagues in 1976. Kosrat was arrested in 1977 by Baath Party security services in Kirkuk for organizing political activities, and was released the same year. After his release from prison, he rejoined Peshmerga fighters. In 1981, Kosrat became a politburo member of the Komala Party and director of its secret branches. Kosrat assumed leadership roles in the PUK, taking control of the party's Third and Fourth Centers in 1984-1985. Kosrat is known as the strongman of Erbil city and its surroundings and has a reputation for bravery.

During the 1991 Kurdistan March Uprisings, he served as a prominent Peshmerga commander, responsible for liberating the cities of Erbil and Kirkuk. In Erbil the people had attempted to liberate the city by themselves, but were unsuccessful. Alongside the Peshmerga, the people of Erbil managed to liberate the city on 11 March and Kosrat was the first commander to enter. He walked from the city citadel to the governors office alongside the people. Kosrat, a native of Erbil, enjoyed huge support within the city and is described as being a charismatic figure.

As a Peshmerga commander, he led an assault on al-Qaeda-linked Ansar al-Islam forces in 2003, dislodging the group from its stronghold.

Under the leadership of Kosrat, Kurdish forces launched a large-scale military operation to further push back ISIS and eliminate threats to the city of Kirkuk and its oilfields. His forces then recaptured the city, and Kosrat said “What has been conquered with Kurdish blood shall remain Kurdish soil.”

Former director of International Crisis Group Joost Hiltermann describes Kosrat as vigorous, razor sharp and articulate, with a commanding presence despite his ailment which derives from shrapnel lodged in his body.

Patriotic Union of Kurdistan
Kosrat was elected the leader of the Supreme Political Council of the Patriotic Union of Kurdistan at the 4th Congress of the PUK held on 21 December 2019 in Suleimaniyah, Iraq.

Kurdistan Region Parliament
In 1992, he was elected as a member of Kurdistan Parliament.

Kurdistan Regional Government
Kosrat held the post of prime minister from 1993 to 2001, in the second cabinet (1993-1996) and third cabinet (1996-2001). He was succeeded by Barham Salih in 2001. In a Wikileaks cable, the U.S. State Department describes his tenure as Prime Minister as largely well regarded as a populist leader.

Kurdistan Presidency Council
Kosrat has held the post of vice president twice: 2005 to 2009 and 2009 to 2017. As vice president he was deputy commander-in-chief of the Peshmerga. He has called on Turkey to return to peace talks. Kosrat has long reiterated the need to forge a single Kurdish army despite having his own private militia. Kosrat has said that Kurds can accomplish their goals if they are united, and that Kurdish independence is not a dream.

Arrest Warrant 
The Iraqi Supreme Judicial Council in 2017 said a court in Baghdad had issued an arrest warrant for Kosrat in connection with trying to provoke a civil war between Kurds and Arabs.

Arrest Warrant Overturned by PM Haydar Abadi
In 2017, PM Haider al-Abadi’s office overturned the arrest warrant issued by a Baghdad court citing that there was no legal basis for the warrant. Since then, Kosrat Rasul Ali has been to Baghdad several times, including his famous trip to Baghdad to win presidency of the Republic of Iraq for Barham Salih.

PUK Gorran Agreement
The 25-point agreement aimed at coordination on strategic issues between the two parties was signed by the PUK’s Kosrat Rasul Ali and Gorran’s Nawshirwan Mustafa, with all other senior party leaders present.

Relationship with Talabani family
Kosrat accused some PUK elements of “treason,” especially those from the Talabani family, saying it was a "disgusting act, they are slipping themselves into the black pages of the history of our nation".

Personal life 
In retaliation for his role as leader of the Peshmerga in the Erbil province, Saddam's Baathist regime killed two of his sons in an airstrike in 1987; they were ages 9 and 10. Kosrat's two surviving sons are involved in politics; his first son, Shalaw, is a member of the PUK leadership council, and he claimed he was wounded in the battle to retake Mosul in 2016, where five accompanying Peshmerga were killed. Kosrat's second son, Darbaz, is Minister of Housing and Reconstruction in the eighth cabinet of the Kurdistan Regional Government. Kosrat was seriously injured in fighting in 1985, and continues to suffer from wounds to his neck as well as Parkinson's.

Controversy 
Orthopaedic physician Bakhtyar Amin Baram alleges he was attacked by four gunmen who were loyal to Kosrat Rasul and his sons, the attack came after he talked about fake medicine in the markets of the Kurdistan Region in the media, the doctor has filed a lawsuit against Kosrat Rasul with the European Union court. A Kurdish journalist named Zardasht Osman was kidnapped in the capital of the semiautonomous Kurdistan region of Iraq, tortured and then found dead with two bullets in the head on a highway, his last published article was on Kosrat. Shoresh Haji a senior Gorran leader says "Even though I consider Kosrat a friend, he just can't let go of the material benefits that have come to him and his family from his relationship with PUK." and "Talabani had wearied of Kosrat, he had cost Talabani too much money over the years " Talabani was considering "to cut Rasoul loose".

References

1952 births
Living people
People from Erbil Governorate
Vice Presidents of Kurdistan Region
Prime Ministers of Kurdistan Region
Patriotic Union of Kurdistan politicians
Kurdish nationalists